Thomas David MacKenzie (4 October 188228 November 1927) was an Australian rules footballer in the (then)  South Australian Football Association (SAFA)/South Australian Football League (SAFL).

MacKenzie was the first man to win three Magarey Medals as the fairest and most brilliant player in the competition. He was a cool centreman who excelled under pressure.

He later served in World War I, being wounded several times while fighting in France.

In 1996 MacKenzie was inducted into the Australian Football Hall of Fame.  In 2002 he was inducted into the South Australian Football Hall of Fame.

References

External links 

West Torrens Football Club players
North Adelaide Football Club players
Australian Football Hall of Fame inductees
Magarey Medal winners
Australian rules footballers from South Australia
Australian military personnel of World War I
South Australian Football Hall of Fame inductees
1882 births
1927 deaths